Mahmoud Abdel Rahim Abdel Rahim (born 25 May 1987), known by his nickname Genish, is an Egyptian professional footballer who plays as a goalkeeper for Egyptian Premier League club Future and the Egypt national team.

Career

Zamalek
Genish joined Zamalek from Olimpi after Zamalek manager then Hossam Hassan recommended him for the club. He played multiple matches with Zamalek but he was mainly the second goalkeeper after the legendary goalkeeper Abdelwahed El-Sayed. His real start with Zamalek was in 2014–15 Egypt Cup when Zamalek manager Jesualdo Ferreira decided that he will play all cup matches with the substitute goalkeepers Mohamed Abou Gabal and Genish, to give Ahmed El-Shenawy some rest. Genish played match in round 16 against Haras El Hodoud making a remarkable performance and helping his club winning 3–1. He played the next match against El Ittihad Alexandria in quarterfinal helping his club winning by saving 3 penalties. He played the next match in semifinal against Smouha. He helped his club passing to the final by saving 4 penalties in the penalty shootout. He played the final against Zamalek main rival Al Ahly helping Zamalek winning the cup after winning 2–0. Zamalek fans started calling this championship "Genish Championship" because he was the main reason to win it.

Genish also played against Orlando Pirates in CAF Confederation Cup helping Zamalek win 4–1.

On 11 February 2017, Genish helped Zamalek win the Egyptian Super Cup after defeating Al Ahly 3–1 in penalties. Genish saved two penalties.

Honours
Zamalek
Egyptian Premier League: 2014–15, 2020–21
Egypt Cup: 2012–13, 2013–14, 2014–15, 2015–16, 2017–18, 2018–19, 2020–21
Egyptian Super Cup: 2016, 2019–20
CAF Confederation Cup: 2018–19
 CAF Super Cup: 2020
Saudi-Egyptian Super Cup: 2018

Future
 EFA League Cup: 2022

References

1987 births
Living people
Sportspeople from Alexandria
Egyptian footballers
Egypt international footballers
Association football goalkeepers
Egyptian Premier League players
Olympic Club (Egypt) players
Zamalek SC players
2019 Africa Cup of Nations players
Future FC (Egypt) players